Carl Johann Philipp Noé Richard Anschütz FRSE (Hon) (10 March 1852 – 8 January 1937) was a German organic chemist.

Anschütz received his PhD at the University of Bonn for his work with August Kekulé. He became Kekulé's assistant and in 1898, his successor as Professor of Chemistry at the University of Bonn. His biography of Kekulé opened a view on the claims of Archibald Scott Couper as an independent co-discoverer of the ability of carbon atoms to link to each other to form chains (the theory of chemical structure).

References

Further reading

Richard Anschütz, August Kekulé, 2 volumes (Berlin: Verlag Chemie, 1929)

1852 births
1937 deaths
20th-century German chemists
University of Bonn alumni
Academic staff of the University of Bonn
Honorary Fellows of the Royal Society of Edinburgh
19th-century German chemists